Arf-GAP with SH3 domain, ANK repeat and PH domain-containing protein 1 is a protein that in humans is encoded by the ASAP1 gene.

Interactions 

DDEF1 has been shown to interact with Src.

References

Further reading